"Green Circles" is a song by English rock band Small Faces first recorded in 1966. While not issued as a single in the United Kingdom, it was originally intended as the B-Side of "Here Come the Nice", their first single release on Immediate Records, this release was cancelled and the B-Side was replaced with "Talk to You." It remains one of the group's most well known and influential songs, and showcases the group's venture into psychedelic music, which would be prevalent in their later work, such as on "Itchycoo Park", "Lazy Sunday" and Ogdens' Nut Gone Flake.

Song profile 
The song was written by Steve Marriott, Ronnie Lane and Michael O'Sullivan, it was recorded on 13 December 1966 at IBC Studios at a session attended by Melody Maker journalist Nick Jones. The group resumed further work added at Olympic Studios on 28 February 1967, Olympic Studios was the same studio the band recorded most of their tracks while signed to Immediate. It was the last track on side one of the band's second studio album Small Faces and features Ronnie Lane on lead vocals. The song got its release in the US on the album There Are But Four Small Faces in March 1968.

The inspiration for the lyrics came after Michael O'Sullivan, a friend of the group, lived at their residence for a while. He is therefore listed as a writer for the song and became the only person not in the group to receive songwriting credits on the album.

Set in B-flat major (the same key as their single "Here Come the Nice"), the song is described as highly psychedelic, and it is about the topic of being visited by a enlightened stranger. The recording engineers for the track are John Pantry, Glyn Johns and George Chkiantz, who was responsible for the flanging effect both heard on this song, and later on "Itchycoo Park". Johns and Chkiantz were also featured as the recording engineers on most tracks of the album.

Small Faces made an appearance on Beat-Club on 23 September 1967 , in which they mimed the song, along with "Itchycoo Park". Earlier versions can be found on the Here Comes The Nice boxset.

Personnel 

 Steve Marriott - guitar, backing vocals
 Ronnie Lane - bass guitar, lead vocals
 Ian McLagan - piano, backing vocals
 Kenney Jones - drums

In popular culture and covers 

 The 1968 song "Hurdy Gurdy Man" by Donovan may have taken inspiration from the song, name in the similar vocal melody, and the topic of being visited by a stranger. In 2012, Donovan revealed that he had become friends with Small Faces in 1965.
British pop duo Twice as Much covered the track for their second studio album That's All in 1968.

References 

1967 songs
Small Faces songs
Songs written by Steve Marriott
Songs written by Ronnie Lane
Psychedelic songs